Time in Brazil is calculated using standard time, and the country (including its offshore islands) is divided into four standard time zones: UTC−02:00, UTC−03:00, UTC−04:00 and UTC−05:00.

Time zones

Fernando de Noronha time (UTC−02:00) 
This is the standard time zone only on a few small offshore Atlantic islands. The only such island with a permanent population is Fernando de Noronha, with 3,140 inhabitants (2021 estimate), 0.0015% of Brazil's population. The other islands (Trindade and Martim Vaz, Rocas Atoll and Saint Peter and Saint Paul Archipelago) either are totally uninhabited or have small seasonally rotating Brazilian Navy garrisons or teams of scientists.

Brasília time (UTC−03:00) 
The main time zone of Brazil comprises the states in the South, Southeast and Northeast regions (except the small islands mentioned above), plus the states of Goiás, Tocantins, Pará and Amapá, and the Federal District, which includes the national capital city, Brasília. About 93% of the Brazilian population live in this time zone, which covers about 60% of the country's land area. It comprises 26 of the 28 largest metropolitan areas in Brazil.

Amazon time (UTC−04:00) 
This time zone is used in the states of Mato Grosso, Mato Grosso do Sul, Rondônia, Roraima, and most of Amazonas. Although this time zone covers about 36% of the land area of Brazil (an area larger than Argentina), only about 6% of the country's population live there (about 13 million people, slightly more than the city of São Paulo).

Until 2008, the areas of the state of Pará west of the Xingu River and north of the Amazon River were also part of this time zone; then they joined the rest of the state in observing Brasília time (UTC−03:00). Although other changes to Brazilian time zones enacted at that time have since been reverted (see below), western and northern Pará still remain in UTC−03:00.

Acre time (UTC−05:00) 
This time zone was reinstated in 2013, after having been abolished for over five years. It is used in the far-western tip of the country, which includes the entire state of Acre and the southwestern portion of the state of Amazonas (west of a line connecting the cities of Tabatinga and Porto Acre). These areas cover only about 4% of the Brazilian territory (although that is still about the size of Germany) and have only about 0.5% of the country's population (little more than 1 million people).

On 24 June 2008, these areas advanced their clocks by an hour, so that they became part of the UTC−04:00 time zone. However, in a non-binding referendum held on 31 October 2010, a slight majority of Acre voters voted in favour of returning the state to UTC−05:00. On 30 October 2013, Brazilian President Dilma Rousseff enacted Law 12876, establishing that the time zone switch would occur on Sunday, 10 November 2013. Since then, the state of Acre and the southwestern part of the state of Amazonas are again 5 hours behind UTC.

Unofficial observance 
Unofficially, 32 municipalities in eastern Mato Grosso, located in the Araguaia valley, observe UTC−03:00, Brasília time. This practice started in Barra do Garças in 1998. Banks and government services still observe the legal time in these locations (UTC–04:00).

Unofficially, the municipality of Bataguassu in eastern Mato Grosso do Sul also observes UTC−03:00, Brasília time.

Daylight saving time 

Initially it applied to the whole country, but from 1988 it applied only to part of the country, usually the southern regions, where DST is more useful due to a larger seasonal variation in daylight duration. It typically lasted from October or November to February or March.

The most recent DST rule specified advancing the time by one hour during the period from 00:00 on the first Sunday in November to 00:00 on the third Sunday in February (postponed by one week if the latter fell on carnival), applicable only to the South, Southeast and Central-West regions, which comprise about 64% of the Brazilian population. During DST, Brasília time moved from UTC−03:00 to UTC−02:00; the other states that did not follow DST observed a change of the offset to Brasília time.

Brazil abolished DST in 2019.

IANA time zone database
The IANA time zone database contains 16 zones for Brazil. Columns marked with * are from the file zone.tab of the database.

See also 
Date and time notation in Brazil
List of time zones

Notes

References

External links 
 Time Service Division of the National Observatory of Brazil
 Legal time in Brazil 

 
Time in South America